Aschhe Abar Shabor is a 2018 Indian Bengali-language crime thriller film directed by Arindam Sil. It is the sequel to 2016 film Eagoler Chokh and the third installment in the Goenda Shabor film series. The film released on 19 January 2018. It is based on Prajapatir Mrityu O Punorjanmo, a story written by Shirshendu Mukhopadhyay.

Plot 
The story begins with three young ladies (Anamika Chakraborty as Sofia and her two friends, Uma and Joyi) attend a party together with all of them hooking with different partners. A series of murders haunting the city with two women killed at Beniapukur and Burrabuzar, Sofia was murdered later . While investigating, Police found a dating site with Sofia was associated. Kolkata Police detective Shabor Dasgupta (Saswata Chatterjee) is entrusted with the daunting task of solving the mystery when suddenly another similar murder occurred in Chandannagar. Under orders from DIG Rajat Gupta, ACP Shabor Dasgupta (Saswata Chatterjee), Detective Department, Lalbajar, Kolkata Police along with his assistants Senior Inspector Nandalal Roy(Subhrajeet Dutta) and Senior Inspector Sanjib Das( Gaurav Chakraborty) travel to Chandannager to investigate the possible serial killer who murdered Rinku Roy(Diti Saha) and Sofia( Anamika Chakraborty) and the other two. Bijoy Sen(Indraneil Sengupta ) who is much hated by the locals and was in a relationship with Rinku is suspected of murdering her and is beaten severely at his house by the locals. Shabor Dasgupta forces Nandalal Roy to create a dating site at the same website as Sopia to contact with Sopia's friends and also to find more about a fake profile of Bijoy. Rinku's grandma( Lolita Chaterjee) says Shabor that she had seen someone arriving on a blue car from her window at Bijoy Sen's house before Rinku arrived at that place riding her cycle the night before Rinku was murdered. Shabor questions Sumana( Arunima Ghosh ) about her husband Bijoy Sen.  On the other hand, Nandu goes on a date with one of Sopia's friend Uma( Tuhina Das) . Next day Nandu gets a sudden call from Uma while he was on the street with ACP Shabor and Sanjib saying that she was being attacked by someone named Bijoy Sen and just when she was about to say her location she is stopped and killed in a similar way like the previous two cases. Shabor convinces Sumana to meet Biyoy, in case she can bring out any information from Bijoy regarding his involvement. Learing about Sharon (Anjana Basu ), ACP Shabor and Nandu travel to Lucknow to question Sharon and later learns that Sharon and her boyfriend Sujit(Mir Afsar Ali ) do not live in together anymore upon accidentally finding Sharon's advance on Bijoy. Sumana meets Bijoy only to feel sympathy for him. Uma's roommate Joyi(Priyanka Mondal) finds some selfie about Uma's murderer. ACP Shabor asks Joyi to be the bait and blackmail all possible suspects. As Joyi welcomes the suspect to their house, the suspect attacks suddenly and ACP and his team comes to the rescue and chases the criminal behind these crimes to find out its one of her friends, who loved her. Sumana wants to meet with Bijoy once again and finally after meeting him they reconcile.  ACP Shabor Dasgupta explains how the negligence of parents about their kids and how pursuing their own interests in turn leaves the child vulnerable and alone in their vital period of childhood.

Cast
 Saswata Chatterjee as ACP Shabor Dasgupta Kolkata Police
 Subhrajeet Dutta as SI Nandalal Roy (Kolkata Police)
 Gaurav Chakrabarty as SI Sanjib Das (Kolkata Police)
 Indraneil Sengupta as Bijoy Sen
 Arindam Sil as DIG Rajat Gupta
 Lolita Chatterjee as Rinku's grandmother
 Anamika Chakraborty as Sofia
 Arunima Ghosh as Sumana, Bijoy's wife
 Anjana Basu as Sharon 
 Mir Afsar Ali as Sujit Dutta 
 Diti Saha as Rinku Roy
 Darshana Banik
 Tuhina Das as Uma
 Priyanka Mondal as Joyi, Uma's roommate
 Anindya Chatterjee

Production
After success of Eagoler Chokh a sequel has been confirmed by director Arindam Sil. In August 2017, the director told the media, the shooting of the third installment of Goenda Shabor franchise will start from 7 September 2017. The film has been titled Aschhe Abar Shabor, and will be based on the novel Prajapatir Mrityu O Punorjanmo by Shirshendu Mukhopadhyay. After completing its first schedule in West Bengal, the team will fly for Lucknow to shoot rest of the part. Saswata Chatterjee, Subhrajit Dutta and Gaurav Chakrabarty returning for the sequel as their respective characters with Indraneil Sengupta, Anindya Chatterjee, Anjana Basu and Mir Afsar Ali with major characters. Shooting started from early September, for a release on 19 January 2018.

Marketing
The first look poster with some plot synopsis has been revealed by director Sil, on 12 October 2017. The motion poster has been published by director Sil on 13 October. The theatrical poster of the film release on 15 November 2017

Soundtrack

Critical reception
The Times of India rated it 3 stars out of five. The film got generally favorable reviews from critics. Diganto Patrika gave it 3.5 stars out of five, and said, "The film is equally accurate in Drama and thriller than its previous installments." The Quint gave it 2.5 stars out of five, and said, "Watch Aschhe Abar Sabor for the glimpses of Saswata’s sass and for the sake of nostalgia, if you must. Otherwise, it is quite a disappointing outing for an otherwise fabulous director."

See also
 Ebar Shabor
 Har Har Byomkesh
 Byomkesh Pawrbo

References

External links
 

Indian detective films
Bengali-language Indian films
2010s Bengali-language films
2010s crime drama films
2018 films
Films based on works by Shirshendu Mukhopadhyay
Films directed by Arindam Sil
2018 drama films
Films scored by Bickram Ghosh